Ad van Kempen  (born 12 July 1944) is a Dutch actor. He performed in more than forty films since 1974.

Selected filmography

External links 
 

1944 births
Living people
20th-century Dutch male actors
Dutch male film actors
Dutch male television actors
Maastricht Academy of Dramatic Arts alumni